Meerdervoort is a former municipality in the Dutch province of South Holland. It was southwest of the town of Zwijndrecht.

The municipality existed between 1817 and 1855, when it merged with Zwijndrecht.

References

Former municipalities of South Holland
Zwijndrecht, Netherlands